Agus Hamdani (4 July 1970 – 11 November 2021) was an Indonesian politician. A member of the United Development Party, he served as Regent of Garut from 2013 to 2014 and Deputy Regent from 2012 to 2013.

References

1970 births
2021 deaths
People from Bandung
21st-century Indonesian politicians
United Development Party politicians